Zweilütschinen railway station is a railway station in the municipality of Gündlischwand in the Swiss canton of Bern. The station is on the Berner Oberland Bahn, whose trains operate services to Interlaken Ost, Grindelwald and Lauterbrunnen. It takes its name from the hamlet of Zweilütschinen, which itself is named after the nearby confluence of the White and the Black branches of the Lütschine river.

The depot and workshops of the Berner Oberland Bahn are located beside the station. The railway's two branches, to Grindelwald and Lauterbrunnen, diverge to the south of the station, following the valleys of the Black and White Lütschine rivers respectively.  17 March 2014 marked the 100th anniversary of the electrification of the line, an event marked with a celebration at the Bahnhof buffet.

Services 
 the following rail services stop at Zweilütschinen:

References

External links 
 
 Zweilütschinen station page on the Jungfraubahnen web site
 

Railway stations in the canton of Bern
Bernese Oberland Railway stations
Railway stations in Switzerland opened in 1890